Busch Field is a stadium on the campus of the College of William and Mary located in Williamsburg, Virginia. It is currently used by the college's field hockey team for home games, as well as many intramural and club sport contests. There are two fields in the designated "Busch Field" area. One is composed of artificial astro turf while the other is artificial field turf. The name for the stadium comes from Anheuser-Busch, formerly the largest American brewer. Anheuser-Busch has a large presence in the Williamsburg area, including a brewery and the theme park Busch Gardens Williamsburg.  Adjacent to Busch Field are the Busch Tennis Courts, also sponsored by the company.

Busch Field was, at one time, home to the school's soccer and lacrosse programs before those teams moved to the newly constructed Albert-Daly Field in 2004. The field has two sister stadiums: Coffey Stadium, located in Fairfax, Virginia, and Dragon Stadium, located in Southlake, Texas.

References

William & Mary Tribe sports venues
William & Mary Tribe soccer
William & Mary Tribe field hockey
Sports venues in Hampton Roads
College field hockey venues in the United States
Defunct National Premier Soccer League stadiums
1992 establishments in Virginia
Soccer venues in Virginia
College soccer venues in the United States